Rio Ronuro Ecological Station is an ecological station in the state of Mato Grosso, Brazil.
It protects an area of contact between Amazon rainforest in the north and Cerrado semi-deciduous forest in the south.
Since being created in 1998 it has been reduced in size and has suffered from significant deforestation.

History

The Xingu Indigenous Park is to the north east of the unit.
The advisory council was formed on 12 April 2010.
The conservation unit is supported by the Amazon Region Protected Areas Program.

Environment

The Rio Ronuro Ecological Station (ESEC) is in the Xingu River basin, and is drained by the Santo Cristo, Hinternam, Von Den Steinen and Ronuro rivers.
It is in the Amazon biome. 
The unit is in an area with an equatorial climate with a dry season in the winter.
Average temperatures are above .
The landscape is relatively flat.
The ESEC would be in the proposed South Amazon Ecotones Ecological Corridor.

38% of the ESEC is covered by pioneer formations and 62% by mature forest, including open submontane Amazon rainforest in the north, seasonal semi-deciduous Cerrado forest in the south and the contact zone between these biomes.
Species found in the unit include giant otter (Pteronura brasiliensis), black caiman (Melanosuchus niger), maned wolf (Chrysocyon brachyurus), cougar (Puma concolor), jaguar (Panthera onca), giant anteater (Myrmecophaga tridactyla) and giant armadillo (Priodontes maximus).
Rare endemic fauna include catitas (marmosa species) and sauiás (proechimys species).

Challenges

The unit is threatened by illegal logging, land clearance for agriculture, indiscriminate hunting and fires.
As of 2002 15% of the unit had been deforested. By 2005 that had risen to 20%.
A 2014 study of ten protected areas in Mato Grosso, Rondônia and Pará whose size had been reduced since creation, including the Rio Ronuro Ecological Station, concluded that the reduction in area had caused the deforestation process to accelerate.

Notes

Sources

1998 establishments in Brazil
Ecological stations of Brazil
Protected areas of Mato Grosso
Protected areas established in 1998